Mariano Antonelli (24 June 1933 – 29 September 2006) was an Italian sports shooter. He competed in the 50 metre rifle, prone event at the 1960 Summer Olympics.

References

External links
 

1933 births
2006 deaths
Sportspeople from the Province of L'Aquila
Italian male sport shooters
Olympic shooters of Italy
Shooters at the 1960 Summer Olympics